Erik Sanko (born 27 September 1963) is a bass player from New York who has played in The Lounge Lizards and currently active in Skeleton Key.

Biography
In the past he also worked with notable musicians including Marc Ribot, John Cale, Yoko Ono, Suzanne Vega, Jim Carroll, Gavin Friday, They Might Be Giants, The Melvins, James Chance and the Contortions, Danny Elfman, The Kronos Quartet and  members of Enon and Sleepytime Gorilla Museum. Besides being a musician, he's also a visual artist who creates marionettes. Erik Sanko is married and works with visual artist/set designer/director Jessica Grindstaff. His work has been reviewed in The Village Voice and The New York Times. In 2007 he, together with Jessica Grindstaff, founded Phantom Limb, a multi-media based theater company for which Erik is primarily composer and puppet maker.

Discography
 Past Imperfect, Present Tense (Jetset Records, 2001)
With John Cale
Antártida (1995)
Walking on Locusts (1996)
HoboSapiens (2003)
Extra Playful (2011)
Shifty Adventures in Nookie Wood (2012)
With Jim Carroll
Pools of Mercury (1998)
With Anna Domino
Mysteries of America (1990)
With The Fertile Crescent
The Fertile Crescent (1992)
With Gavin Friday
 Adam 'n' Eve, (1992)Shag Tobacco (1996)
With The Lounge LizardsBig Heart: Live Tokyo (1986)No Pain for Cakes (1987)Voice of Chunk (1988)Queen of All Ears (1998)
With John LurieFishing with John (1998)Legendary Marvin Pontiac (2000)
With Mono PuffUnsupervised (1996)
With Seigen OnoNekono Topia Nekono Mania (1990)
With Yoko OnoBlueprint for a Sunrise (2001)
With Skeleton KeySkeleton Key (1996)Fantastic Spikes Through Balloon (1997)Obtainium (2002)Gravity is the Enemy (2011)
With They Might Be GiantsSevere Tire Damage (1998)Live (1999)A User's Guide to They Might Be Giants (2005)
With Suzanne VegaDays of Open Hand (1990)
With John WaiteTemple Bar'' (1995)

References

 Bio on epitonic

External links
 http://www.eriksanko.com/
 http://www.myspace.com/eriksanko
 http://www.myspace.com/skeletonkey
 Fortune Teller a play by Erik Sanko

1963 births
Living people
Guitarists from New York City
American male bass guitarists
20th-century American bass guitarists
20th-century American male musicians
The Lounge Lizards members